The Doctor Who Role Playing Game is a Doctor Who roleplaying game published by FASA in 1985.  The game allows players to assume similar roles to the Doctor and his companions or as agents of the Celestial Intervention Agency.

Setting 
The game was based on the programme and used it as its primary source material.  The main set of three rulebooks was followed by several separately published adventures and supplements for the game, which provided details about the Daleks, the Cybermen, and the Master. The supplements contained two pamphlets, one for players and another for game masters.

History 
The game came out in two printings, one showing painted artwork of the Fourth Doctor and Leela, the other a publicity photograph of them.  Neither the Fourth Doctor nor Leela, at that date, still appeared in the series. The painting printing had interior rulebooks with slick white covers, while the photographic edition featured more textured brown Victorian-styled rulebooks.

FASA also published two solo play gamebooks: Doctor Who and the Vortex Crystal (1986) by  William H. Keith, Jr., featuring the Fourth Doctor, Sarah Jane Smith, and Harry Sullivan and the Daleks, set on the planet Gathwyr; and Doctor Who and the Rebel's Gambit (1986) by William H. Keith, Jr., featuring the Sixth Doctor, Peri, and Harry Sullivan, set during the American Civil War,

System 
Its game mechanics were based on (though not identical to) the Star Trek RPG also published by FASA.

Supplements

Daleks and The Dalek Problem

Two part module that includes full details about the Daleks' back story, playing guide stats, and a new scenario.
1985 - FASA 9101 -

The Master and The Master: CIA File Extracts

1985 - FASA 9102 - 

Within it is stated that Adric was saved from death by a Time Lady named Lenora and taken to Gallifrey.

The Cybermen and Cyber Files: CIA Special Report

1985 - FASA 9103 -

The Iytean Menace

"Out in the fog-shrouded night of Victorian London, an evil force was lurking, waiting to strike. A senseless murder over a strange artifact was only the very beginning of the terror of The Iytean Menace. What was the ancient evil, and how had it been awakened? Where would it strike next?

The Time Lord and his Companions had been sent to the capital of Queen Victoria's realm to learn the source of a strange weapon that should never have been on Earth at all.  What they found was a web of mystery and deception that led them, step by step, to a confrontation with The Iytean Menace." (J. Andrew Keith)

1985 - FASA 9201 -

The Lords of Destiny

"The World-Ship of Ydar was a monster, vast, implacable, and set on a collision course with the Galaxy of Man. Giant starship and mobile world, Destiny of Ydar is both refuge and vengeance of a long-dead civilization which must be stopped, or worlds will die. The cooperation of the Ydarans is vital. Too bad they're caught up in a civil war just now. Too bad, too, that they've forgotten the rest of the universe exists..."

1985 - FASA 9202 -

Countdown

"The sudden appearance of a dangerous gravity bubble causes the TARDIS to materialize aboard a ship of the Earth Empire on an emergency mission to deliver vital serum to a plague-ridden world.  Before the adventure is over, the Time Lord and his Companions must contend not only with the death-dealing gravity bubble, but with the ship’s paranoid computer, space pirates, and an attack by androids as well."

1985 - FASA 9203 -

The Hartlewick Horror

"Why are the villagers of a sleepy little town like Hartlewick disappearing? Has the archeological excavation of an ancient Druidic mound awakened something that was better left undisturbed? And are these strange occurrences related to the presence of a mysterious energy field?
The Time Lord and his Companions are sent to Hartlewick, England, to locate the source of this unexplained energy field. But they do not have much time. Forces are at work to unleash something hideous and all-too-powerful upon the residents of 1923 Earth."

This scenario was originally intended for Chaosium's Call of Cthulhu roleplaying game. However, after it was rejected, the author reworked it for FASA's Doctor Who roleplaying game.

1985 - FASA 9204 -

The Legions of Death

"The legions were on the march... but Rome had never faced an enemy like this one. An evil renegade Time Lord has allied himself with British tribesmen to lure a Roman army -- and a Roman Emperor -- into a deviously plotted trap. History will be changed, and an army of fanatic conquerors loosed upon the Galaxy if a Time Lord and his Companions cannot stop the renegade's sinister plan.  As time runs out, the adventurers race to their final confrontation with the Legions of Death." (J. Andrew Keith)

1985 - FASA 9205 -

City of Gold

"Dinosaurs in the twenty-first century?  That was only the first mystery that confronted the Time Lord and his Companions when they set out to investigate a violent revolution in an age of turmoil, and stumbled into a plot that could end human history -- and change the universe forever.  A lost city and a vanished race from the depths of time and [sic] hold the key to the destiny of the Earth, unless the adventurers can penetrate the mysteries of the City of Gold."

1986 - FASA 9206 -

The Warrior's Code

"Arigato, Doctor Who.  A collision in the Vortex with an unknown timeship…a forced materialization on the rocky seaside cliffs of feudal Japan…a power play among the samurai warlords who wield absolute power in an ancient and mysterious realm.  For the Time Lord and his Companions, those were only the first steps in a dangerous game, where one man’s ambition could bring the collapse of human history.  Stranded, cut off from help or contact with Gallifrey, the time travelers must band together to free themselves from old Japan, history from a madman’s plot, and humanity itself from oblivion in a distant but all-too-real future.  To achieve their goals, the adventurers must learn to understand the shifting politics and timeless culture of the Land of the Rising Sun.  They must come to understand the samurai and their Bushido…The Warrior’s Code."

1986 - FASA 9207 -

Reception
Paul Mason reviewed The Doctor Who Role Playing Game for White Dwarf #72, giving it an overall rating of 8 out of 10, and stated that "I can appreciate what an achievement it is to wrap together the Dr Who mythos into a coherent whole, having tried it myself - there has been a lot of effort put into this game, and it shows."

In a retrospective review of The Doctor Who Role Playing Game in Black Gate, Ty Johnston said "Over all, The Dr. Who Roleplaying Game could be a blast to play, as I rediscovered a few years ago when I got to experience it once again with a group in a short campaign."

Reviews
Different Worlds #41
The V.I.P. of Gaming Magazine #3 (April/May, 1986)

See also
 Time Lord, another Doctor Who RPG
 Doctor Who: Adventures in Time and Space RPG.

References

American role-playing games
FASA games
Role Playing Game
Role-playing games based on television series
Role-playing games introduced in 1985
Time travel and multiple reality role-playing games
The Doctor Who Role Playing Game